God Willin' & the Creek Don't Rise is singer-songwriter Ray LaMontagne's fourth full-length release, which was released on August 17, 2010.

The record is credited to "Ray LaMontagne and the Pariah Dogs". This is the first time that LaMontagne has released music in collaboration with other artists, within the context of a band.

It is the first album that was completely produced by LaMontagne. The music was recorded in a period of two weeks at LaMontagne's home in Massachusetts.

On December 1, 2010, the album was nominated for two Grammy awards, including Best Contemporary Folk Album, which it won. The song "Beg Steal or Borrow" was nominated for Song of the Year.

Track listing

Personnel
Ray LaMontagne collaborated with the following musicians on this album:
Ray LaMontagne – vocals and acoustic guitar on all tracks, harmonica on tracks 8, 9 and 10
 Jennifer Condos – bass on all tracks except track 9
 Jay Bellerose – drums on all tracks except tracks 5 and 9
 Eric Heywood – pedal steel guitar on tracks 2, 3, 4 and 5, acoustic guitar on tracks 6, 7 and 8, electric guitar on tracks 1 and 10
 Greg Leisz – electric guitar on tracks 1 and 4, pedal steel guitar on tracks 3 and 6, acoustic guitar on track 5, lap steel guitar on track 8, electric baritone guitar on track 2, banjo on track 7, acoustic resonator steel guitar and mandola on track 10
 Patrick Warren – keyboards on track 6
 Ryan Freeland – accordion on track 8
Technical
 Ray LaMontagne – producer
 Ryan Freeland – recorder and mixer
 Michael McDonald – management
 Megahn Foley – art direction and design
 Mark Seliger – portrait photography
 Tobias LaMontagne – still photography
 Jay Bellerose – additional photography
 Sarah Sousa – additional photography

Charts

Weekly charts

Year-end charts

Certifications

References

External links
 
 Billboard review of Gossip in the Grain

2010 albums
Ray LaMontagne albums
RCA Records albums
Grammy Award for Best Contemporary Folk Album